The 1970–71 Liga Española de Baloncesto season was the 15th season of the Liga Española de Baloncesto and was played between 10 October 1970 and 7 March 1971. The season ended with Real Madrid winning their 13th title.

Overview before the season
12 teams joined the league, including two promoted from the 1969–70 Segunda División.

Promoted from 1969–70 Segunda División
Manresa Kan's
Breogán Fontecelta

Teams and locations
<onlyinclude>

Regular season

League table

Relegation playoffs

|}

Statistics leaders

Points

References

ACB.com  
Linguasport 
FEB 

Liga Española de Baloncesto (1957–1983) seasons
   
Spanish